Gloria Sevilla (January 31, 1932 – April 16, 2022) was a Filipino film actress.

Career
Sevilla was heralded as the "Queen of Visayan Movies" for her screen portrayal legacy in Visayan-made movies in the Philippines during the 1950s and 1960s. The Gawad Urian Awards honored her with a "Lifetime Achievement award" while The EDDYS honored her with an "Icon Award", both for her contributions to Philippine cinema.

Sevilla received her first FAMAS Award Best Supporting Actress in the movie Madugong Paghihiganti (1962). She won the FAMAS Award Best Actress twice for the movies - Badlis Sa Kinabuhi (1969) and Gimingaw Ako (1973). Throughout her career, Sevilla has starred in several iconic films such as Dyesebel (1978), Guhit Ng Palad (1988), Matud Nila (1991), The Flor Contemplacion Story (1995), Kay Tagal Kang Hinintay (2002), Lapu-lapu (2002), Bida si Mister, Bida si Misis (2002), and El Presidente (2012).

Sevilla also remained active in Philippine television. During the 1970s she top billed the comedy Ang Biyenan kong Mangkukulam with Pancho Magalona and Chicháy. She also produced and starred in the sitcom, Mommy Ko si Mayor with children, Mat, Dandin Lilibeth and Suzette with fellow Cebuana Flora Gasser. Sevilla also lent support in dramas Be Careful With My Heart.

Personal life
Sevilla's first husband was actor Mat Ranillo Jr., who died in a plane crash in 1969. They had five children. She subsequently married actor and director Amado Cortez, who also served a stint as the Philippine Consul General in San Francisco before his death in 2003. They had one daughter.

She is the mother of actresses Suzette Ranillo and Lilibeth Ranillo, actor Mat Ranillo III, and singer-composer Dandin Ranillo.

She died on April 16, 2022, at the age of 90 in Oakland, California.

Filmography

Film

Television

Awards and nominations

References

External links

Mat Ranillo Jr. and Gloria Sevilla at movie-industry.blogspot.com

1932 births
2022 deaths
Cebuano film actresses
Cebuano television actresses
Cebuano Roman Catholics
People from Cebu City
Actresses from Cebu
Cebuano women comedians
20th-century Cebuano actresses
21st-century Cebuano actresses
Gloria